Creston is an unincorporated community in Pennington County, in the U.S. state of South Dakota.

History
A post office called Creston was established in 1886, and remained in operation until 1946. The community's name is a transfer from Creston, Iowa.

References

Unincorporated communities in Pennington County, South Dakota
Unincorporated communities in South Dakota